Evolution is the sixth studio album by guitarist Tony MacAlpine, released on October 10, 1995 through Shrapnel Records.

Critical reception

Robert Taylor at AllMusic gave Evolution four stars out of five, calling it a "predominantly shred-oriented session" and "one of Macalpine's more complete releases", while remarking that it provides a "promising glimpse into his more fusion-oriented endeavors he would explore with Planet X and CAB." He also noted "Time Table" and "Futurism" as highlights.

Track listing

Personnel
Tony MacAlpine – guitar, keyboard, mixing, producer
Mike Terrana – drums
Tony Franklin – bass
Steve Fontano – engineering, mixing, production
Kenneth K. Lee Jr. – mastering

Notes

References

External links
In Review: Tony MacAlpine "Evolution" at Guitar Nine Records

Tony MacAlpine albums
1995 albums
Shrapnel Records albums